Kuybyshevsky District may refer to:
Kuybyshevsky District, Russia, name of several districts and city districts in Russia
Kuibyshevskyi District, Donetsk, a city district of Donetsk, Ukraine
Kuibysheve Raion or Kuibyshevskyi Raion, former name of Bilmak Raion in Zaporizhia Oblast, Ukraine

See also
Kuybyshevsky (disambiguation)
Kuybyshev (disambiguation)

District name disambiguation pages